Holothrips australis is a species of thrips in the Phlaeothripinae subfamily, first described in 1974 by Laurence Mound as Adelothrips australis. This thrips is found in the Australian Capital Territory and South Australia.

This thrips, like others of its genus, is fungus feeding and not usually found in large colonies.

References

Phlaeothripidae
Thrips
Taxa named by Laurence Alfred Mound
Insects described in 1974